Rhopobota okui is a species of moth of the family Tortricidae. It is found in China (Henan, Guangdong, Sichuan, Guizhou) and Japan.

References

Moths described in 2000
Eucosmini